Kilmeston is a small village and civil parish in the City of Winchester district of Hampshire, England. Historically the village has been known as Chelmestune or Kilmiston, and some sources still quote Kilmiston as the official name of the civil parish.

Kilmeston Manor, a substantial country house, is a grade II* listed building.

The parish church of St Andrew has its origin in medieval times. Rebuilt in 1772 and again in the late 19th century, it is a grade II listed building.

 Lt.-Gen. Sir Henry Warde lived at Dean House, Kilmeston.

References

Villages in Hampshire